Chris Harker is an American politician. A Democrat, he served for six years as a state representative for Oregon's House District 34.

Family
Harker and his spouse, a teacher, have two children.

Occupation
Chris Harker founded Cayuse, Inc. in 1994 and is its CEO. In 2012, he sold the company to Evisions, Inc. for an undisclosed amount.

Political career
On November 4, 2008, Chris Harker defeated Republican opponent Piotr Kuklinski and was elected to the Oregon House of Representatives with more than twice his opponent's votes. Harker represented communities from Washington County, encompassing parts of Beaverton and unincorporated Washington County.

In the 76th Legislative Assembly, Harker served as Co-Chair of the Joint Legislative Audits and Information Management and Technology Committee, as a member of the House Subcommittee on Higher Education, and as a member of the House Human Services Committee. During the 75th Legislative Assembly, he served as the vice chair of the House Health Care Committee, and as a member of both the House Education Committee and the Joint Ways and Means General Government Subcommittee.

Committee assignments

2011-2012
In the 2011-2012 legislative session, Harker has been appointed to these committees:
 Joint Legislative Committee on Audits and Information Management and Technology, Co-Chair
 House Higher Education Subcommittee
 House Human Services Committee

2009-2010
 Joint Ways and Means General Government Subcommittee
 House Education Committee
 House Health Care Committee

Education
 Post-Doctoral Fellow, The Mayo Clinic, Rochester, MN (1985–1987).
 Ph.D., Human Physiology, The University of Michigan, Ann Arbor (1985).
 B.S., Plant Ecology, The University of Michigan, Ann Arbor (1977).

References

External links
Representative Harker's campaign
Oregon House of Representative - Rep. Chris Harker
Project Vote Smart biographical profile
 Project Vote Smart legislative profile
Representative Harker's facebook

Living people
Democratic Party members of the Oregon House of Representatives
University of Michigan alumni
1954 births
Place of birth missing (living people)
Educators from Oregon
Businesspeople from Oregon
21st-century American politicians
American chief executives